Godolphin Stables, also known as Stanley House Stables, is a thoroughbred racehorse ownership, training and breeding operation in Newmarket, Suffolk, which has produced many notable horses. It is one of the most famous racing establishments in the world and is currently owned and operated by Godolphin Racing, the UK's largest flat racing operation.

History and ownership
The stables were built by Frederick Stanley, 16th Earl of Derby (also the namesake of the Stanley Cup in North American ice hockey), in 1903 and originally named Stanley House stables after Lord Derby's nearby house. They were acquired by Godolphin Racing in April 1988 and renamed Godolphin Stables under head trainer John Gosden. The name refers to the well known horse Godolphin Arabian, one of the first Arabian horses brought to Britain.

The stables now serve as a base for Godolphin's British operations.

Group 1 winners
Horses trained at the stables that have won Group 1 races include:
Swynford, winner of the 1910 St. Leger
Sansovino, winner of the 1924 Derby
Colorado, winner of the 1926 2,000 Guineas
Fairway, winner of the 1928 St. Leger 
Hyperion, winner of the 1933 Derby
Quashed, winner of the 1935 Epsom Oaks
Tide-way, winner of the 1936 1,000 Guineas
Watling Street, winner of the 1942 Derby
Alycidon, winner of the 1949 Ascot Gold Cup

References

Racing stables in Newmarket